Market Dojo is an e-Procurement software company based in Stonehouse, England. The company was established in 2010 by Nick Drewe, Alun Rafique, and Nic Martin.  Alun previously worked at Rolls-Royce before meeting Nick Drewe at Vendigital, whilst Nic Martin came from Attensity.   All three co-founders studied at Bristol University.  The company's competitors include Ariba, Curtis Fitch, and Scan market amongst others.

Technology 
Market Dojo's software is based on the Ruby on Rails (RoR) platform, the same used by other e-Procurement solutions such as Coupa.  Having previously being hosted with Liberata, the software now operates out of the leading provider of cloud services, Google Cloud Platform (GCP). Market Dojo offerings range from: e-Sourcing, Opportunity Analysis, Project Management, Supplier Onboarding, SPM & SRM, Contracts Management and Savings Tracking.

Funding 
In 2011, Market Dojo was awarded its first grant by the Technology Strategy Board to the amount of £25,036 towards an overall project cost of £55,635.  The deliverable from the project was to evolve the functionality of the Market Dojo software in order to broaden its appeal beyond the Private Sector and provide a low-cost, EU-compliant and fully auditable tool that could assist Public Sector organizations across all member states of the European Union.

In 2012, Market Dojo was awarded a second grant from the Technology Strategy Board, this time to the tune of £24,949 towards an overall project cost of £55,443.  This project was to develop an innovative procurement web application that will provide spend category insight, strategy and opportunity assessment for public and private sector procurement teams.

In 2013, Market Dojo was awarded its third grant by the West of England Local Enterprise Partnership to the amount of £25,000 towards their research and development.

In 2018, Market Dojo received significant investment from a large Sovereign Wealth Fund. The investment has enabled the companies continued growth in staff, as well as the implementation of major new releases and software improvements.

Products 
Market Dojo have released seven individually branded products:
 Market Dojo: their flagship e-Sourcing tool to enable organizations to negotiate with suppliers online.
 Innovation Dojo:  released on the back of their 2011 Technology Strategy Board grant, it was designed to help buyers and suppliers collaborate on ideas for improving the supply chain.
 Category Dojo: the result of the 2012 Technology Strategy Board, it helps organizations better understand and prioritize their negotiation opportunities.
 SIM Dojo: the supplier On-boarding tool, helping organizations to centrally manage supplier information and reduce administration costs while enabling accountability and auditability.
 Quick Quotes: a simpler version of the sourcing tool for smaller procurement needs 
 Contract Dojo: a contract repository for maintaining documents from suppliers and ensuring that KPIs are being met 
 SRM Dojo: a Supplier Relationship Management tool generating a database of suppliers, with a holistic view of all their data, and allowing for task management

Academia and Professional Relationships 
Market Dojo actively collaborate with academia, forging strong ties with the University of Greenwich and the University of the West of England where they annually give lectures on e-Auctions to their MBA and Business School students.

Market Dojo have also given talks at events for the professional industry body CIPS on numerous occasions.

Lastly Market Dojo is an approved supplier on the UK Government Crown Commercial Service G-Cloud framework for providing e-Sourcing software as a service.

References

External links
 Market Dojo's website
 Market Dojo’s blog

British companies established in 2010
Companies based in Bristol
2010 establishments in England